In the mathematical area of graph theory, a graph is even-hole-free if it contains no induced cycle with an even number of vertices. More precisely, the definition may allow the graph to have induced cycles of length four, or may also disallow them: the latter is referred to as even-cycle-free graphs.

 demonstrated that every even-hole-free graph contains a bisimplicial vertex, which settled a conjecture by Reed.

Recognition

 gave the first polynomial time recognition algorithm for even-hole-free graphs, which runs in  time.
 and  improved this to  time.

While even-hole-free graphs can be recognized in polynomial time, it is NP-complete to determine whether a graph contains an even hole that includes a specific vertex.

It is unknown whether graph coloring and the maximum independent set problem can be solved in polynomial time on even-hole-free graphs, or whether they are NP-complete.
However the maximum clique can be found in even-hole-free graphs in polynomial time.

Notes

References

External links
 

Graph families